Stefanos Dimitriadis (born 8 September 1989, Athens) is a Greek swimmer. At the 2012 Summer Olympics, he competed in the Men's 100 metre butterfly and 200 m butterfly, finishing in 40th and 23rd places overall respectively in the heats, failing to qualify for the semifinals.

At the 2016 Summer Olympics in Rio de Janeiro, he competed in the men's 200 metre butterfly. He finished 18th in the heats with a time of 1:56.76 and did not qualify for the semifinals.

References

Greek male swimmers
Living people
Olympic swimmers of Greece
Swimmers at the 2012 Summer Olympics
Swimmers at the 2016 Summer Olympics
Male butterfly swimmers
1989 births
Mediterranean Games gold medalists for Greece
Mediterranean Games silver medalists for Greece
Mediterranean Games bronze medalists for Greece
Swimmers at the 2013 Mediterranean Games
Swimmers at the 2018 Mediterranean Games
Mediterranean Games medalists in swimming
Swimmers from Athens
Universiade bronze medalists for Greece
Universiade medalists in swimming
Medalists at the 2013 Summer Universiade
20th-century Greek people
21st-century Greek people